The Arts Consortium is the official Tulare County, California, USA arts council.  It runs under the California state arts council, the California Arts Council (CAC).

External links
Arts Consortium Webpage
CALAA Listing

San Joaquin Valley
Tulare
Tulare County, California